Arrows is a Unicode block containing line, curve, and semicircle symbols terminating in barbs or arrows.

Block

Emoji
The Arrows block contains eight emoji:
U+2194–U+2199 and U+21A9–U+21AA.

The block has sixteen standardized variants defined to specify emoji-style (U+FE0F VS16) or text presentation (U+FE0E VS15) for the
eight emoji, all of which default to a text presentation.

History
The following Unicode-related documents record the purpose and process of defining specific characters in the Arrows block:

See also 
Mathematical operators and symbols in Unicode
Unicode input

References 

Unicode blocks